Norape cingulata is a moth of the family Megalopygidae. It was described by E. Dukinfield Jones in 1921.

References

Moths described in 1921
Megalopygidae